I Am is the fifth studio album by the heavy metal band Becoming the Archetype.  The album was recorded between May 21 and June 17 and released on September 18, 2012 through Solid State Records. This album is a departure from the previous effort, as Seth Hecox says, "gone are the sitars and horns of Celestial Completion. Instead, we've crafted an album full of the heaviest and most technical songs we've ever written.” It is the first and only release by the band to feature Chris McCane on vocals, Codey Watkins on bass, and Chris Heaton on drums. Guitarist/vocalist Seth Hecox was the only original member from the debut album featured on I Am. The first single to promote the album was the song "The Time Bender", released on August 28, 2012, as well a lyric video and an official video.

Track listing

Personnel

Becoming the Archetype
 Chris McCane - Lead Vocals
 Daniel Gailey – Lead Guitars, Backing Vocals
 Seth Hecox – Rhythm Guitars, Keys, Clean Vocals
 Codey Watkins – Bass
 Chris Heaton – Drums

Production and Recording
 Shane Frisby - Producer
 Tue Madsen - Mixing
 Troy Glessnar - Mastering

Artwork and packaging
 Dan Seagrave – Cover Artwork & Additional Paintings

Charts

References

Becoming the Archetype albums
Solid State Records albums
Albums with cover art by Dan Seagrave
2012 albums